HMS Wasp was an Archer type sloop ordered on 25 April 1847 from Deptford Dockyard. Two references stipulate that Parthian, ordered with Archer the year prior was renamed Wasp when ordered as a sloop. However, Parthian remained on the books at Deptford, as a Rifleman type gunvessel until cancelled in June 1849. Therefore Wasp was a new build. She served on many different stations during her career, including West Coast of Africa, in the Mediterranean and Black Sea during the Russian War of 1854 - 55, on the South East Coast of America, Cape of Good Hope where she went aground twice and the East Indies before being sold for breaking in December 1869.

Wasp was the seventh named vessel since it was introduced for a 8-gun sloop launched by Portsmouth Dockyard on 4 July 1749, and sold on 4 January 1781.

Parthian was the second named vessel since it was introduced for a 16=gun brig sloop of the Cherokee class, launched by Bernard of Deptford on 13 February 1808 and wrecked off the coast of Egypt on 15 May 1828.

Construction
Wasp was laid down during October 1847 and launched on 28 May 1850. She was completed for sea on 26 October 1850 at Woolwich. Her first cost was £33,521.

Commissioned Service

First Commission
Her first commission was on 5 October 1850 under Commander William P. Crozier, RN for service on the West Coast of Africa. After Commander Crozier was invalided, Commander Charles W. Bonham, RN (acting) took command on 16 April 1852. In August 1852 under the command of Lieutenant Samuel Pritchard, RN (acting), she returned to Home Waters. On 20 August 1852 Lord John Hay took command for service in the Mediterranean. In 1854 she moved with the British Fleet to the Black Sea for the duration of the Russian War. On 2 February 1855 she returned to the Mediterranean under the command of Commander Henry Lloyd, RN. At the end of 1855 she returned to Home Waters paying off at Sheerness on 7 January 1856.

Second Commission
On 18 July 1856 she was commissioned under Commander Frederick H. Stirling, RN for service on the East Coast of South America. She returned to Home Waters to pay off at Sheerness on 9 April 1860.

Third Commission
She was recommission the next day on 10 April 1860 under command of Commander Charles Stirling, RN for service on the Cape of Good Hope. She was aground for a week or more, and the damage to the engines precluded their use for the rest of the commission. She returned to Home Waters and paid off at Portsmouth on 10 December 1861.

Fourth Commission 
On 16 November 1863, she commissioned under Captain William Boden, RN for service in the East Indies. She captured an Arab Slaver off Zanzibar on 2 May 1865. Captain Normand B. Bedingfeld, RN took command on 29 January 1866. She returned to Home Waters in early 1868.

Disposition
Upon her arrival in Home Waters, she paid off at Portsmouth on 22 April 1868. She was sold to Charles Marshall on 2 December 1869 and broken in Plymouth.

HMS Wasp was awarded the Battle Honour Black Sea 1854 – 55.

Citations

References

 Lyon Winfield, The Sail & Steam Navy List, All the Ships of the Royal Navy 1815 to 1889, by David Lyon & Rif Winfield, published by Chatham Publishing, London © 2004, 
 The Navy List, published by His Majesty's Stationery Office, London
 Winfield, British Warships in the Age of Sail (1817 – 1863), by Rif Winfield, published by Seaforth Publishing, England © 2014, e, Chapter 12 Screw Sloops, Vessels ordered or reordered as steam screw sloops (from 1845), Wasp
 Colledge, Ships of the Royal Navy, by J.J. Colledge, revised and updated by Lt Cdr Ben Warlow and Steve Bush, published by Seaforth Publishing, Barnsley, Great Britain, © 2020, e  (EPUB), Section P (Parthian), Section W (Wasp)

Victorian-era sloops of the United Kingdom
Sloops of the Royal Navy
Sloop classes